Jaques Wagner (born 16 March 1951) is a Brazilian politician who was Governor of Bahia from 2007 to 2015 and Minister of Defence in 2015.

Wagner, whose parents were Jewish immigrants from Poland, was born in Rio de Janeiro in 1951. In his youth, he was a member of the Labor Zionist youth organization Habonim Dror. He was a founding member of the Workers' Party (PT), as well as the Central Única dos Trabalhadores (CUT), a union which has organized more than seven million members. He won reelection in the 2010 Bahia gubernatorial election.

Since 2019, he serves as a Senator for the state of Bahia.

References

External links
Jaques Wagner - Candidato a reeleição - Governador da Bahia 
Jaques Wagner 
Reeleição Jaques Wagner 
Jaques Wagner conversa com os internautas 

1951 births
Living people
Governors of Bahia
Workers' Party (Brazil) politicians
Jewish Brazilian politicians
Jewish socialists
Government ministers of Brazil
Brazilian people of Polish-Jewish descent
Members of the Chamber of Deputies (Brazil) from Bahia
Defence ministers of Brazil
Chiefs of Staff of Brazil